Banned is the second EP by UGK. It was released in 1992 by Bigtyme Recordz.

Track listing
"Intro"
"Pregnant Pussy"
"Pusimental"
"Muthafucka Ain't Mine"

Samples

Intro
Short Texas" by UGK

Pregnant Pussy
"Type of Nigga I Am" by Street Military

Muthafucka Ain't Mine
"Darkest Light" by Lafayette Afro Rock Band
"You Can't Fade Me", "Get Off My Dick And Tell Yo Bitch To Come Here" by Ice Cube
"Whatcha See Is Whatcha Get" by The Dramatics

References

1992 EPs
UGK albums
Gangsta rap EPs